Obsidian Ridge is a volcanic mountain ridge in the Spectrum Range of northwestern British Columbia, Canada, located on the south side of Artifact Creek at the southeast end of Mount Edziza Provincial Park. It was named on January 2, 1980 by the Geological Survey of Canada for its high quality of obsidian. Because of its high obsidian content, it was a source for tool making by the local Tahltan people.

See also
Volcanism of Canada
Volcanism of Western Canada

References

Volcanism of British Columbia
Ridges of British Columbia
Tahltan
Ridge
Cassiar Land District